King Edward may refer to:

Monarchs

of England and the United Kingdom
 Edward the Elder (–924) 
 Edward the Martyr (–978)
 Edward the Confessor (–1066)
 Edward I of England (1239–1307)
 Edward II of England (1284–1327)
 Edward III of England (1312–1377) 
 Edward IV of England (1442–1483)
 Edward V of England (1470–1483?) 
 Edward VI of England (1537–1553) 
 Edward VII of the United Kingdom (1841–1910) 
 Edward VIII of the United Kingdom (1894–1972)

of elsewhere
 Edward, King of Portugal (1391–1438)
 Edward Bruce (–1318), High King of Ireland
 Edward Balliol (–1364), King of Scots, considered a usurper

in fiction
 Edward the Benevolent, predecessor to Graham as King of Daventry in the King's Quest series of PC games

Places
 King Edward, Aberdeenshire, Scotland
 King Edward Avenue (disambiguation)

Other uses
 King Edward Hotel (Jackson, Mississippi), a former hotel-now-National Landmark in Jackson, Mississippi
 
 
 King Edward Hotel (Toronto), Ontario, Canada
 King Edward Medical University in Lahore, Pakistan
 King Edward's School (disambiguation)
 King Edward potato
 King Edward station, a rapid transit station in Vancouver

See also
Edward King (disambiguation)